Pierre de Muralt (6 November 1896 – 20 April 1985) was a Swiss equestrian. He competed in two events at the 1928 Summer Olympics.

References

External links
 

1896 births
1985 deaths
Swiss male equestrians
Olympic equestrians of Switzerland
Equestrians at the 1928 Summer Olympics
People from Vevey
Sportspeople from the canton of Vaud